Kekaumenos is the family name of the otherwise unidentified Byzantine author of the Strategikon, a manual on military and household affairs composed c. 1078. He was apparently of Georgian-Armenian origin and the grandson of the doux of Hellas. Despite relevant suppositions, there exists no concrete evidence that he is the famous 11th century general Katakalon Kekaumenos, or his son.

His father-in-law was Nikulitzas Delphinas, a lord of Larissa who took part in the revolt of Bulgarians and Vlachs in 1066.

References

Sources

 "Byzantine Siege Warfare in Theory and Practice" by Eric McGeer from The Medieval City under Siege
 Logos Nouthetetikos, or Oration of Admonition to an Emperor by William North

Byzantine writers
Medieval Greek military writers
11th-century Byzantine people
11th-century Byzantine writers
Year of birth unknown
Year of death unknown